Bosses of the Ballad (subtitled Illinois Jacquet and Strings Play Cole Porter) is an album by saxophonist Illinois Jacquet recorded in 1964 and released on the Argo label featuring Cole Porter compositions performed by Jacquet and an orchestra.

Reception

Allmusic awarded the album 3 stars.

Track listing 
All compositions by Cole Porter
 "I Love You" - 2:36   
 "Get Out of Town" - 2:35   
 "So in Love" - 3:16   
 "I Concentrate on You" - 4:04   
 "You Do Something to Me" - 3:27   
 "Ev'ry Time We Say Goodbye" - 3:50   
 "Use Your Imagination" - 3:15   
 "All Through the Night" - 3:26   
 "Begin the Beguine" - 3:12   
 "It's All Right with Me" - 3:21   
 "Do I Love You?" - 3:27   
 "I've Got You Under My Skin" - 4:12

Personnel 
Illinois Jacquet - tenor saxophone
19-piece orchestra with arrangements by Tom McIntosh and Benny Golson

References 

1964 albums
Argo Records albums
Illinois Jacquet albums
Albums produced by Esmond Edwards
Albums arranged by Benny Golson
Albums arranged by Tom McIntosh